Krapa may refer to:

Krapa, a village in Kollur mandal, Guntur District, Andhra Pradesh, India
Krapa, India, a village in East Godavari district, Mummidivaram, Andhra Pradesh, India
Krapa, Republic of Macedonia